The Deccan Chargers (DC) were a franchise cricket team based in Hyderabad, India, that competed in the Indian Premier League (IPL), a professional Twenty20 cricket (T20) league in India. They were one of the ten teams that competed in the 2011 Indian Premier League, making their fourth appearance in all IPL tournaments. The team was captained by Kumar Sangakkara and coached by Darren Lehmann.

The Deccan Chargers started their campaign by losing their opening fixture of the IPL on 9 April against the Rajasthan Royals and failed to qualify for playoffs finishing seventh in the group stage.

Player Acquisition

The Deccan Chargers retained none of the players from the previous season. They have bought 27 players including 14 players from the auction and still had $1.47million left in their purse in the end out of their allotted $9 million.

Players retained: None

Players released: Harmeet Singh Bansal, Azhar Bilakhia, Sumanth Bodapati, Ravi Teja Dwaraka, Herschelle Gibbs, Adam Gilchrist, Ryan Harris, Mitchell Marsh, Mohnish Mishra, Pragyan Ojha, Ashish Reddy, Kemar Roach, Rahul Sharma, Rohit Sharma, Anirudh Singh, Jaskaran Singh, R. P. Singh, Dwayne Smith, Andrew Symonds, Suman Tirumalasetti, V. V. S. Laxman, Chaminda Vaas, Arjun Yadav, Venugopal Rao Yalaka

Players acquired during the auction: Daniel Christian, Shikhar Dhawan, JP Duminy, Manpreet Gony, Michael Lumb, Chris Lynn, Amit Mishra, Pragyan Ojha, Kevin Pietersen, Kumar Sangakkara, Ishant Sharma, Dale Steyn, Rusty Theron, Cameron White

Uncapped players acquired: Harmeet Singh Bansal, Akash Bhandari, Bharat Chipli, Kedar Devdhar, Ravi Teja Dwaraka, Ishank Jaggi, Ishan Malhotra, Anand Rajan, Ashish Reddy, Jaydev Shah, Ankit Sharma, Sunny Sohal, Arjun Yadav

Squad
 Players with international caps are listed in bold.
 Year signed denotes the season the player first signed for the team

Kit manufacturers and sponsors

Season Overview

Standings

Results by match

Fixtures

All times are in Indian Standard Time (UTC+05:30)

Group stage

Statistics

Source: 2011 IPL Statistics Full Table on Cricinfo

Awards and achievements

Awards
Man of the Match

Achievements
 Ishant Sharma took the first-ever fifer for the Deccan Chargers in the match against Kochi Tuskers Kerala. This is also the best bowling figures of the 2011 Indian Premier League (2011 IPL).
 Amit Mishra took the hat-trick for the Deccan Chargers in the match against Kings XI Punjab. This is also the only hat-trick recorded in the 2011 IPL.

Notes

Footnotes

References

External links

2011 Indian Premier League
Indian Premier League
Cricket in Hyderabad, India